The McPhaul Suspension Bridge, sometimes known as Yuma, Arizona's Bridge to Nowhere is a suspension bridge that used to carry a section of Arizona Route 95 (AZ SR 95, which later became US 95). The bridge is listed on the National Register of Historic Places. The bridge, which was named for local Yuma resident Henry Harrison McPhaul, was built over the Gila River in 1929 and replaced in 1968 when it was deemed insufficient for modern transportation needs.  At only 16 feet wide, the bridge was too narrow for a US numbered highway (in fact, even when built in 1929 it would have been too narrow, as the US highway system required two 9 foot lanes).  A dam and replacement bridge were built and the river was rerouted.

Its main span is a  Warren-type pony truss bridge suspended by cables from rocker type towers.

See also
 List of bridges on the National Register of Historic Places in Arizona

References

External links

Suspension bridges
Road bridges in Arizona
National Register of Historic Places in Yuma County, Arizona
Bridges completed in 1929
U.S. Route 95
Abandoned buildings and structures
Former road bridges in the United States